Paul Neumann may refer to:
 Paul Neumann (Attorney General) (1839–1901), Attorney General of the Kingdom of Hawaii
 Paul Neumann (basketball) (born 1938), American professional basketball player
 Paul Neumann (referee) (born 1869), German referee
 Paul Neumann (swimmer) (1875–1932), Austrian swimmer

See also
Paul Newman (disambiguation)